In mathematics, a weak Hausdorff space or weakly Hausdorff space is a topological space where the image of every continuous map from a compact Hausdorff space into the space is closed. In particular, every Hausdorff space is weak Hausdorff.  As a separation property, it is stronger than T1, which is equivalent to the statement that points are closed. Specifically, every weak Hausdorff space is a T1 space.

The notion was introduced by M. C. McCord to remedy an inconvenience of working with the category of Hausdorff spaces. It is often used in tandem with compactly generated spaces in algebraic topology. For that, see the category of compactly generated weak Hausdorff spaces.

k-Hausdorff spaces

A  is a topological space which satisfies any of the following equivalent conditions: 

 Each compact subspace is Hausdorff.
 The diagonal  is k-closed in 
 Each compact subspace is closed and strongly locally compact.
 A space is  if for each  and each (not necessarily open) neighborhood  of  there exists a compact neighborhood  of  such that

Properties

 A k-Hausdorff space is weak Hausdorff.
 A Hausdorff space is k-Hausdorff.
 A k-Hausdorff space is KC. A  is a topological space in which every compact subspace is closed.
 A space is Hausdorff-compactly generated weak Hausdorff if and only if it is Hausdorff-compactly generated k-Hausdorff.
 To show that the coherent topology induced by compact Hausdorff subspaces preserves the compact Hausdorff subspaces and their subspace topology requires that the space be k-Hausdorff; weak Hausdorff is not enough. Hence k-Hausdorff can be seen as the more fundamental definition.

Δ-Hausdorff spaces

A  is a topological space where the image of every path is closed; that is, if whenever  is continuous then  is closed in  Every weak Hausdorff space is -Hausdorff, and every -Hausdorff space is a T1 space.

See also

 , a Hausdorff space where every continuous function from the space into itself has a fixed point.

References

Properties of topological spaces
Separation axioms